Inez Bjørg David (born 6 February 1982 in Århus) is a Danish actress who has appeared primarily in German productions.

Life 

She went to a theatre school in Copenhagen and took private acting classes. She appeared in many German movies, tv series and soap operas.

Inez also works as a Yoga teacher and regularly holds Yoga classes in and around Berlin.

Inez is an ambassador of the World Future Council and fighting for the rights of women. She is a member of the advisory board of the organization "Cradle to Cradle e.V.", which promotes eco-efficiency. In 2016 she received the German "Next Economy Award" for her work on sustainability.

References

External links 
Official home page of Inez Bjørg David (in German)

21st-century Danish actresses
Danish expatriates in Germany
Living people
1982 births
People from Aarhus
Expatriate actresses in Germany